Chabalala may refer to:

Chabalala (Angolan footballer), also Tshabalala (born 1999), birth name Gaspar Necas Fortunato, Angolan footballer 
Justice Chabalala (born 1991), South African footballer
Kingsol Chabalala (born 1976), South African politician and a Member of the Gauteng Provincial Legislature
Tonic Chabalala (born 1979), South African footballer

See also
Shabalala